The 2009 Major League Baseball draft was held June 9 to June 11 at the MLB Network Studios in Secaucus, New Jersey.

The drafting order is as follows:

First-round selections
Key

Supplemental first-round selections

From Baseball America

Compensation picks

Other notable selections
As of September 2, 2019

NFL players drafted
Jake Locker, 10th round, 321st overall by the Los Angeles Angels of Anaheim, but did not sign
Riley Cooper, 25th round, 754th overall by the Texas Rangers, but did not sign
Eric Decker, 27th round, 822nd overall by the Minnesota Twins, but did not sign
Jacobbi McDaniel, 33rd round, 1006th overall by the Milwaukee Brewers, but did not sign
Colin Kaepernick, 43rd round, 1310th overall by the Chicago Cubs, but did not sign
Anthony Scirrotto, 50th round, 1502nd overall by the Kansas City Royals, signed, but never played

External links
 2009 MLB draft page MLB.com
 2009 Major League Baseball draft at ESPN

References

Major League Baseball draft
Draft
Major League Baseball draft
Major League Baseball draft
Baseball in New Jersey
Events in New Jersey
Sports in Hudson County, New Jersey
Secaucus, New Jersey